Geoeconomics (sometimes geo-economics) is the study of the spatial, temporal, and political aspects of economies and resources. Although there is no widely accepted singular definition, the distinction of geoeconomics separately from geopolitics is often attributed to Edward Luttwak, an American strategist and military consultant, and Pascal Lorot, a French economist and political scientist.

The Singapore Economic Forum has emphasized the increasingly dynamic, complex aspects of leaders' decisions in the “Age of Geoeconomics”. Policy makers and CEOs alike have to "assess constantly techno-economic returns and legal-political risks on a combined geoeconomic plane." Azerbaijani economist Vusal Gasimli defines geo-economics as the study of the interrelations of economics, geography and politics in the "infinite cone" rising from the center of the earth to outer space (including the economic analysis of planetary resources).

In geopolitics, a common approach involves three levels of analysis. Geoeconomics can employ this three layers approach as well. There is a policy layer, as in international political economy; an integration layer, as in economic geography and industrial organization; and a transaction layer, as in the transactions exemplified in financial economics.

"The logic of conflict in the grammar of commerce" 
Luttwak argues that the same logic that underlies military conflict also pertains to international commerce:

 States seek to collect as much in revenue as their fiscal codes prescribe and are not content to let other states tax commercial activity in the former's purview. This is a zero-sum situation. 
 States predominantly regulate economic activity to maximize outcomes within their own borders, rather than for a disinterested transnational purpose, even when the outcome is suboptimal for other states. The logic of state regulation then conforms, in part, to logic of conflict.
 States and blocs of states strive to restrict their payouts and services to their own residents. Moreover, states design their infrastructure projects to optimize domestic utility, regardless of how other states are affected, as opposed to the transnational utility.
 States or blocs of states promote technological innovation to maximize benefits within their own boundaries, rather than for the sake of innovation itself.

Geoeconomics vs. geopolitics
There is not yet an authoritative definition of geoeconomics that is clearly distinct from geopolitics. The challenge of separating geopolitics and geoeconomics into separate spheres is due to their interdependence: interactions among nation-states as indivisible sovereign units exercising political power, and the predominance of neoclassical economics' "logic of commerce" that ostensibly separates market dynamics from political power. The following descriptions of geoeconomics indicate the challenge of distinguishing it from the field of geopolitics:

 Chatham House: "the use of economic tools to advance geopolitical objectives."
 Pippa Malmgren for the CFA Institute Research Foundation: "One can try to refine the definition of geopolitics by exploring the terms geo-economics, geostrategic, and other such derivations, but in the end, geopolitics exists in reality even if it is not well dealt with by theory."
 Merriam-Webster's Dictionary: "1. the combination of economic and geographic factors relating to international trade and 2. a governmental policy guided by geoeconomics"
 Richard Nixon: "Still others contend that, as the cold war weaned, the importance of economic power and ‘geo-economics’ has surpassed military power and traditional geopolitics. America, they conclude, must beat its swords not into plowshares, but into microchips."
 Robert D. Blackwill and Jennifer Harris in War By Other Means: Geoeconomics and Statecraft: "The use of economic instruments to promote and defend national interests, and to produce beneficial geopolitical results; and the effects of other nations’ economic actions on a country's geopolitical goals."

Moreover, the levels of analysis in geoeconomics (policy, integration, and transaction) are similarly entangled with national policy, which can range from tax incentives for particular industries to anti-money laundering laws or sanctions that constrain particular cross-border financial transactions.

Mercantilism 
Geo-economics is not to be confused with mercantilism or neo-mercantilism. Under mercantilism, the goal of which was to maximize national gold stocks, when commercial quarrels evolved into political quarrels, which could then lead to military conflicts. Therefore, mercantilist competition was subordinate to military competition, as the former modality was governed by the ever-present possibility that the ‘loser’ in a commercial quarrel could then challenge the outcome militarily. For example:"Spain might decree that all trade to and from its American colonies could only travel in Spanish bottoms through Spanish ports, but British and Dutch armed merchantmen could still convey profitable cargoes to disloyal colonists in defiance of Spanish sloops; and, with war declared, privateers could seize outright the even more profitable cargoes bound for Spain. Likewise, the Dutch sent their frigates into the Thames to reply to the mercantilist legislation of the British Parliament that prohibited their cabotage, just as much earlier the Portuguese had sunk Arab ships with which they could not compete in the India trade."In the new era of geo-economics, however, there is no superior modality: Both the causes and the instruments of conflict can be economic. When commercial disagreements do lead to international political clashes, the disputes must be resolved with the weapons of commerce.

The "weapons" of geoeconomics 
States engage in geo-economic competition through both through assisting or directing domestic private entities, or through direct action opposing foreign commercial interests:

 States assist private entities through supporting high-risk research and development, initiating overseas market-penetrating investments, and through production over-investment for market-share forcing.
 More directly, states impose taxes and quotas on foreign products, bolster regulatory or covert impediments to imports, engage in discounted export financing, initiate national technology programs, and collect economic and technical intelligence.

According to Luttwak, offensive weapons are more important in geo-economics, as they are in war. Moreover, state-sponsored research and development is the most important of these weapons. "Just as in war the artillery conquers territory by fire, which the infantry can then occupy, the aim here is to conquer industries of the future by achieving technological superiority."The "infantry" in this analogy corresponds to commercial production, which can also be supported by the state through various forms of subsidies.

Yet another geo-economic weapon is predatory finance. If operation subsidies are insufficient to allow domestic exporters to overcome strong competitors, states can offer loans at below-market interest rates. The United States’ Export-Import, for example, provides loan guarantees to finance exports, and equivalent institutions exist across all major industrial countries."Thus foreigners routinely pay lower interest rates than local borrowers, whose taxes pay for the very concessions that foreigners receive. That already amounts to hunting for exports with low-interest ammunition, but the accusation of predatory finance is reserved for cases where interest rates are suddenly reduced in the course of a fought-over sale. Naturally, the chief trading states have promised to each other that they will do no such thing. Naturally, they frequently break that promise."

"Weaponized interdependence"
"Weaponized interdependence" is a term defined by Henry Farrell and Abraham L. Newman. Farrell and Newman do not address geoeconomics directly, however, their article addresses core factors for how power is exercised in the framework of geoeconomics:"Specifically, we show how the topography of the economic networks of interdependence intersects with domestic institutions and norms to shape coercive authority. Our account places networks such as financial communications, supply chains, and the internet, which have been largely neglected by international relations scholars, at the heart of a compelling new understanding of globalization and power."The framework used by Farrell and Newman is based on network theory, and frames the structure of power as a network of asymmetric interrelationships that enable central actors to "weaponized the structural advantages for coercive ends." States which obtain a sufficient structural advantage will be able to exercise either or both a "panopticon effect" and a "chokepoint effect". The panopticon effect is based upon Jeremy Bentham's Panopticon, which enables a few central actors to observe the activities of others due to the information access afforded by the network structure. The chokepoint effect is the ability of states with an advantageous position to limit or penalize the use of key information nodes (sometimes referred as "hubs") by others.

"The laws of geo-economic gravity" 
M. Nicolas J. Firzli of the Singapore Economic Forum has argued that "adhering to the laws of geo-economic gravity" including the need for financial self-sufficiency and the existence of advanced, diversified energy and transportation infrastructure assets, are now essential to ensure the effective sovereignty of a state: "the government of Qatar is now paying an incommensurate price for having thought it could defy forever the laws of geo-economic gravity."

From that perspective, investment attractiveness and the capacity to project soft power across considerable distance as China has done through its Belt and Road Initiative are also viewed as a key determinants of geo-economic strength.

Here, large private sector asset owners such as pension funds are expected to play an increasingly important part, alongside US and Chinese state actors:

See also 
 Economic geography
 International political economy
 Industrial organization
 Geopolitical ontology
 Financial economics
 Geostrategy
 International relations

Further reading 

Luttwak, Edward N. (1999). "Theory and Practice of Geo-Economics" from Turbo-Capitalism: Winners and Losers in the Global Economy. New York: HarperCollins Publishers.
Solberg Søilen, Klaus (2012). Geoeconomics. Bookboon, London.
Ankerl, Guy (2000).  Coexisting Contemporary Civilizations: Arabo-Muslim, Bharati, Chinese, and Western. INUPress, Geneva. 
Gasimli, Vusal (2015). Geo-Economics. Anadolu University, Turkey, 207 p. 
Chohan, Usman W. (2015). Geostrategic Location and the Economic Center of Gravity of the World. McGill University, Canada.
Blackwill, Robert D., Harris, Jennifer M. War by Other Means: Geoeconomics and Statecraft. Harvard University Press. Cambridge, MA. 
Munoz, J. Mark (2017). Advances in Geoeconomics. Routledge : NY.

References

Geopolitics
Interdisciplinary subfields of economics
International relations